Ramakrishnan is a Tamil forename or surname. 

People named Ramakrishnan:

 Venki Ramakrishnan, British-American structural biologist, awarded the 2009 Nobel Prize for Chemistry.
 S. Ramakrishnan (activist), disability rehabilitation activist from southern Tamil Nadu, founder of Amar Seva Sangam
 S. Ramakrishnan, Tamil author and Tamil film dialogue writer
 Raghu Ramakrishnan, Indian-American computer scientist, vice-president of Yahoo!
 T. K. Ramakrishnan, Indian politician from Kerala
T. V. Ramakrishnan (* 1941), Indian theoretical physicist
 Therambil Ramakrishnan, Indian politician from Kerala
 Shanker Ramakrishnan, Indian film director from Kerala
 C. K. Ra or C. K. Ramakrishnan Nair, Indian painter from Kerala
 Chirayinkeezhu Ramakrishnan Nair, Malayalam lyricist from Kerala
 Malayattoor Ramakrishnan, Indian novelist from Kerala
 Kadammanitta Ramakrishnan, Indian poet from Kerala 
 Alladi Ramakrishnan, Indian physicist and founder of Matscience
 Ramakrishnan (actor), Indian film actor